Birbhum Lok Sabha constituency is one of the 543 parliamentary constituencies in India. The constituency centres on the western part of Birbhum district in West Bengal. All the seven assembly segments of No. 42 Birbhum Lok Sabha constituency are in Birbhum district. The seat was reserved for scheduled castes from 1962 to 2004, but was declared a free seat from 2009 general elections.

Assembly segments

As per order of the Delimitation Commission issued in 2006 in respect of the delimitation of constituencies in the West Bengal, parliamentary constituency no. 42 Birbhum is composed of the following assembly segments from 2009:

Prior to delimitation, Birbhum Lok Sabha constituency was composed of the following assembly segments:Rajnagar (SC) (assembly constituency no. 287), Suri (assembly constituency no. 288), Mahammad Bazar (assembly constituency no. 289), Rampurhat (assembly constituency no. 291), Hansan (SC) (assembly constituency no. 292), Nalhati (assembly constituency no. 293) and Murarai (assembly constituency no. 294).

Members of Parliament

.* In 1951 and 1957, Birbhum had dual seats.

Election results

17th Lok Sabha: 2019 General Elections

General election 2014

2009 results

General elections 1951-2004
In 1951 and 1957 Birbhum had dual seats. It had single seats in other years, Most of the contests were multi-cornered. However, only winners and runners-up are mentioned below:

References

See also
 Birbhum district
 List of Constituencies of the Lok Sabha

Lok Sabha constituencies in West Bengal
Politics of Birbhum district